The Women's 25 km Open Water swimming race of the 2009 World Aquatics Championships took place on Saturday July 25, at Ostia beach in Rome. 18 women from 10 different countries competed. Angela Maurer of Germany took home the gold with a time of 5:47:48.0 just pipping Anna Uvarova at the finish by 3.9 seconds.

Results

Key: OTL = Over Time Limit, DSQ = Disqualified, DNF = Did not finish, DNS = Did not start

See also
Open water swimming at the 2007 World Aquatics Championships – Women's 25 km

References

World Aquatics Championships
Open water swimming at the 2009 World Aquatics Championships
2009 in women's swimming